The 2010 Arizona State Sun Devils baseball team represented Arizona State University in the 2010 NCAA Division I baseball season. The Sun Devils played their home games at Packard Stadium. The team was coached by Tim Esmay in his 1st season at Arizona State.

The Sun Devils reached the College World Series, entering as the top seed but were eliminated by eventual champion South Carolina in the first elimination round.

Roster

Schedule

Ranking movements

References 

Arizona State
Arizona State Sun Devils baseball seasons
College World Series seasons
Pac-12 Conference baseball champion seasons
Arizona State
Arizonia